Kurtalan is a municipality in the Kurtalan District of Siirt Province in Turkey. The municipality is populated by Kurds of the Pencenarî tribe and had a population of 36,273 in 2021.

Government 
In the local elections of 2019 Baran Akgül was elected as Mayor.

Transport 
In Kurtalan railway station is the eastern terminus of the Southern Kurtalan Express between Ankara and Kurtalan operated by TCDD Taşımacılık.

Notable People
 Baran Akgül - Mayor and Politician

References

Populated places in Siirt Province
Kurdish settlements in Siirt Province